Sahrdaya College of Engineering is an Engineering college situated in Kodakara, Thrissur District which offers Bachelors (Biomedical Engineering, Biotechnology Engineering, Civil Engineering, Computer Science and Engineering, Electronics and Communication Engineering, Electrical and Electronics Engineering), Masters (Computer Science and Engineering, Embedded systems, Industrial Biotechnology)  and Doctoral (Science, Technology, Engineering and Mathematics STEM) programmes in Engineering and Technology. Sahrdaya is the "only Engineering College in Kerala, consistently with above 80% pass" (2009, 2010, 2011) in the result analysis of engineering colleges at Kerala by the Department of Technical Education and University of Calicut under the direction of Hon High Court of Kerala in 2012. The college is run by Syro-Malabar Catholic Diocese of Irinjalakuda. The college is affiliated to All India Council for Technical Education (AICTE) New Delhi, and the APJ Abdul Kalam Technological University.

Sahrdaya College of Engineering and Technology (Sahrdaya), was established in 2002, and is promoted by the Irinjalakuda Diocesan Education Trust, is an ISO 9001:2015 certified Institution. Sahrdaya, also holds accreditation from NBA (BME,BT,CE,CSE),NAAC and Institution of Engineers (India), is considered one of the fastest-growing Engineering college in Kerala with recognition from Department of Scientific and Industrial Research (DSIR) of Govt. of India as Scientific and Industrial Research Organization (SIRO). State of the art infrastructure of the institute spread over 45 acres green campus with total build-up area of 57854 sq.m.

References

Catholic universities and colleges in India
All India Council for Technical Education
Colleges affiliated with the University of Calicut
Private engineering colleges in Kerala
Engineering colleges in Thrissur district
Educational institutions established in 2002
2002 establishments in Kerala